is the lead vessel of the s of the Japan Maritime Self-Defense Force (JMSDF).

Design
The hull design is generally based on the one of the Murasame class. However, as a part of weapons was changed, the internal structure has also been changed. And it was said that the large lattice mast was degrading its stealthiness in the Murasame class, so in this class, it was considered to change to two small masts, but it was not implemented.

Although its displacement become slightly increased, there is no change in its main engines, as it is not a big difference that has little effect on the performance of the ship.

Construction and career 
Takanami was authorized under the Medium-term Defense Buildup Plan of 1996, and was built by IHI Marine United shipyards in Uraga, Kanagawa. She was laid down on 25 April 2000, launched on 27 July 2001. She was commissioned into service on 12 March 2003, and was initially assigned to the JMSDF Escort Flotilla 1 based at Yokosuka.

Takanami, along with the destroyer  and supply ship Mashu was assigned to the Indian Ocean in August 2004 to provide assistance to anti-terrorist coalition forces in Afghanistan as part of Operation Enduring Freedom. On her return voyage to Japan in December 2004, the 2004 Indian Ocean earthquake and tsunami struck, and she was diverted to Thailand to participate in international rescue and recovery operations.

On 13 October 2009, Takanami, along with the destroyer , was dispatched to the coast of Somalia to participate in anti-piracy escort operations. From 7 November – 20 February 2010 she undertook 34 sorties, escorting 283 vessels safely. She returned to Japan on 18 March 2010.

Takanami was one of many in the JMSDF fleet participating in disaster relief after the 2011 Tōhoku earthquake and tsunami. She arrived at Ishinomaki, Miyagi the day after the disaster, rescuing 32 people.

On 11 October 2011 Takanami was dispatched to Aden, Yemen together with the destroyer , to resume anti-piracy escort operations off the coast of Somalia. The context for this extended deployment off the Horn of Africa was the "Law on the Penalization of Acts of Piracy and Measures Against Acts of Piracy (Anti-Piracy Measures Law)". She returned to Yokosuka on 12 March 2012 and is currently assigned to the Sixth Squadron of the JMSDF Escort Flotilla 2.

On 16 November 2016, Takanami entered New Zealand waters to celebrate their navies 75th anniversary. She departed on 22 November.

In February 2020, the ship deployed to the Middle East to undertake, according to the Japanese government, an "intelligence-gathering deployment to protect vital oil shipments from the region". The vessel carried out its duties independently of the US-led International Maritime Security Construct.

Notes

References

 
Saunders, Stephen. IHS Jane's Fighting Ships 2013-2014. Jane's Information Group (2003). 

2001 ships
Takanami-class destroyers
Ships built by IHI Corporation